Jan Krissler, better known by his pseudonym starbug, is a German computer scientist and hacker. He is best known for his work on defeating biometric systems, most prominently the iPhone's TouchID. He is also an active member of the German and European hacker community.

Fingerprints of prominent German politicians 

Krissler, along with Chaos Computer Club published the fingerprints of then Interior Minister Wolfgang Schäuble as a means of protest as well as proof of concept. He shot traces of a glass used by Schäuble using a digital camera and tweaked it digitally. Previously, Schäubles Ministry of the Interior had introduced biometric passports which included a digital copy of the holder's fingerprint.

He further refined the attack in 2014 when he reproduced Minister of Defense Ursula von der Leyen's fingerprint from a high resolution press photo. The attack was presented during 2014's Chaos Communication Congress.

Scientific work 

Next to his activities and popular papers published as an activist, Krissler is also a published scientist. His early works looked into the security of biometric systems. Later, Krissler researched foundations of fiberoptical systems and the development of novel attacks on smart cards.

From 2014 onwards, his work has focused on novel methods of attacking biometric systems. He was internationally recognized for his research on the risks emanating from high resolution smartphone cameras which allowed to covertly steal fingerprints. Deficiencies in biometric payment systems is another field of his research.

Currently, Krissler is a research assistant at TU Berlin working with the research group of Jean-Pierre Seifert.

References 

Hacking (computer security)
German computer scientists